The men's triple jump event at the 2015 Summer Universiade was held on 8 and 9 July at the Gwangju Universiade Main Stadium.

Medalists

Results

Qualification
Qualification: 16.50 m (Q) or at least 12 best (q) qualified for the final.

Final

References

Triple
2015